Gentilly  is a station on the line B of the Réseau Express Régional, a hybrid suburban commuter and rapid transit line. It is named after the city of Gentilly, Val-de-Marne where the station is located.

History
The Compagnie du Paris-Orléans (PO) commissioned the Gentilly station in 1891, when the Sceaux line was put on normal track gauge (before the Ligne de Sceaux used a special large gauge).It was a simple halt, perhaps an enlarged gatekeeper's house.

The current passenger building was built in 1933 by the company's architect, Louis Brachet. It is located at the end of the tunnel dug from 1935, during work to remove the level crossings of the Sceaux line, by engineers from the Compagnie du PO. Indeed, the removal of the level crossing which cut the boulevard Jourdan at the level of the Cité Universitaire required major works including the creation of a 520-meter underground tunnel passage under the City park and the reconstruction of the Gentilly and Cité Universitaire stations .

Railway situation
Established at an altitude of 72 m, Gentilly station is located on the RER B line, in the eponymous town, in the immediate vicinity of the "Periphérique" and therefore of Paris. It is built just outside the tunnel from Paris, in a trench open, in a slight upward curve with 2 lateral platform.
The station is located at "Point Kilometrique"(PK) 8.158 (southern ending of platform)

There are two accesses:

 To the north the main entrance av Paul Vaillant couturier
 To the south, the entrance on the railway bridge.

Connection
The station is served by:

bus line  of the RATP bus network
Bus line V5 of the Valouette bus network

Gallery

References

See also

 List of stations of the Paris RER

Railway stations in France opened in 1846